Steeg is a surname. Notable people with the surname include:

Hanne Steeg (born 1965), West German speed skater
Jim Steeg (born 1950), American sports executive
Ludwig Steeg (1894–1945), German politician
Théodore Steeg (1868–1950), French politician, lawyer, and professor